Knee Weakener is a summit on the west side of Salt Lake County, Utah, United States.

References

Mountains of Salt Lake County, Utah
Mountains of Utah